The Central District of Sarayan County also known as Ayask District is a district (bakhsh) in Sarayan County, South Khorasan Province, Iran. At the 2006 census, its population was 23,302, in 6,476 families.  The District has two cities: Sarayan and Ayask.  The District has two rural districts (dehestan): Ayask Rural District and Masabi Rural District.

References 

Districts of South Khorasan Province
Sarayan County